This is a list of the National Register of Historic Places listings in Hutchinson County, Texas.

This is intended to be a complete list of properties and districts listed on the National Register of Historic Places in Hutchinson County, Texas. There are one district and two individual properties listed on the National Register in the county. One property is also a Recorded Texas Historic Landmark.

Current listings

The publicly disclosed locations of National Register properties and districts may be seen in a mapping service provided.

|}

See also

National Register of Historic Places listings in Texas
Recorded Texas Historic Landmarks in Hutchinson County

References

External links

Hutchinson County, Texas
Hutchinson County
Buildings and structures in Hutchinson County, Texas